WCKO-LP (96.7 FM) was a radio station licensed to Cross City, Florida, United States. The station was owned by Cross City Communications, Inc.

Cross City Communications surrendered the station's license to the Federal Communications Commission (FCC) on August 30, 2016; the FCC cancelled the license and deleted the station's call sign on September 6, 2016.

References

External links
 

CKO-LP
CKO-LP
Radio stations established in 2005
2005 establishments in Florida
Defunct radio stations in the United States
Radio stations disestablished in 2016
2016 disestablishments in Florida
CKO-LP